"Stay with Me Tonight" is the debut Japanese single recorded by South Korean pop group Tohoshinki, taken from their debut Japanese album, Heart, Mind and Soul (2006). Released on April 27, 2005 by Rhythm Zone, the song was written by Kei Haneoka and arranged by Maestro T. Taishi Fukuyama provided the instrument arrangements, and Masaya Wada performed the background vocals.

"Stay with Me Tonight" peaked at number 37 on the Oricon Singles Chart and sold 10,116 copies. The song was used as the ending theme for the television drama, .

Formats and track listings
CD+DVD single RZCD-45184
Disc 1 (CD)
"Stay with Me Tonight"
"Try My Love"
"Stay with Me Tonight" (Less Vocal)
"Try My Love" (Less Vocal)
Disc 2 (DVD)
"Stay with Me Tonight" (Video Clip)

CD single RZCD-45185
"Stay with Me Tonight"
"Try My Love"
"Stay with Me Tonight" (Less Vocal)
"Try My Love" (Less Vocal)

Charts

Sales

Release history

References

External links

TVXQ songs
2005 singles
Japanese-language songs
2005 songs
Song recordings produced by Max Matsuura
Rhythm Zone singles